Lethops connectens, the halfblind goby, is a species of marine goby native to the eastern Pacific Ocean from central California, United States to Baja California, Mexico where they inhabit kelp forests.  The adults hide amongst the stones and the holdfasts of kelp on the seabed while the juveniles form schools in the kelp canopy.  This species can reach a length of  TL. Like the name suggests, the eyes of L. connectens are highly reduced.  This species is the only known member of its genus.

See also
Blind goby
Blind fish

References

Gobionellinae
Monotypic fish genera
Fish described in 1926